Aikin is an English surname, and may refer to:

 A. M. Aikin Jr. (1905–1981), American politician
 John Aikin (Unitarian) (1713–1780), English Unitarian scholar and theological tutor, closely associated with Warrington Academy, father of Anna and John
 Anna Aikin (1743–1825), better known as Anna Laetitia Barbauld, a woman of letters who published in many genres
 John Aikin (1747–1822), English physician, father of Arthur, Edmund and Lucy
 Arthur Aikin (1773–1854), English chemist, mineralogist and scientific writer
 Edmund Aikin (1780–1820), English architect
 Lucy Aikin (1781–1864), English writer, particularly of history
 Jesse B. Aikin (1808–1900), American musician
 Laura Aikin (born 1964), American soprano
 Scott Aikin (born 1971), American philosopher

See also 
 
 Aickin, surname
 Aikinite, sulfide mineral of lead, copper and bismuth with formula PbCuBiS3
 Aiken (disambiguation)
 Akin (disambiguation)
 Aikins, surname

References 

English-language surnames